Challis Airport  is a city-owned public-use airport located  northeast of the central business district of Challis, a city in Custer County, Idaho, United States.

Although most U.S. airports use the same three-letter location identifier for the FAA and IATA, Challis Airport is assigned LLJ by the FAA and CHL by the IATA (which assigned LLJ to Silampari Airport in Indonesia).

Facilities and aircraft 
For the 12-month period ending May 22, 2006, the airport had 16,350 aircraft operations, an average of 44 per day: 65% general aviation, 34% air taxi and 1% military.

References

External links 
Challis Airport at Idaho Transportation Department

Airports in Idaho
Buildings and structures in Custer County, Idaho
Transportation in Custer County, Idaho